Răzeni is a commune in Ialoveni District, Moldova. It is composed of two villages, Mileștii Noi and Răzeni.

The Razeni commune is a rural area located in the central part of the Republic of Moldova. It covers a vast territory of around 127 square kilometers, encompassing a number of smaller villages and settlements. The commune is situated in the heart of the country, near the capital city of Chisinau, and is bordered by several other communes and municipalities.

Despite its rural location, the Razeni commune boasts a rich history and cultural heritage, with many important landmarks and historical sites located within its borders. These include ancient churches and monasteries, as well as traditional Moldovan houses and other architectural structures.

The landscape of the Razeni commune is characterized by rolling hills and lush green fields, with many areas of natural beauty and scenic vistas. The climate is temperate and continental, with hot summers and cold winters, making it an ideal location for agriculture and farming.

Agriculture is the primary industry in the Razeni commune, with many local farmers growing a variety of crops and raising livestock. The area is particularly known for its wine production, with many vineyards and wineries scattered throughout the countryside.

In terms of infrastructure, the Razeni commune is relatively well-developed, with good road connections and access to modern amenities and services. There are several schools, healthcare facilities, and other public services located within the commune, making it an attractive place to live for both young families and retirees.

History 
The Răzeni Massacre took place on June 22, 1941, when ten people were killed by the Soviet authorities and buried in a mass grave.

The history of Razeni dates back to the 14th century when the village was first mentioned in historical documents. Over the centuries, Razeni has played an important role in the political and cultural life of Moldova.

During the 16th century, Razeni was one of the main centers of resistance against the Ottoman Empire, which was attempting to expand its territory into Moldova. The village was led by local hero Grigore Ureche, who organized a rebellion against the Ottomans in 1595. The rebellion was successful, and Razeni became a symbol of Moldovan resistance against foreign invaders.

In the 19th century, Razeni was a center of Moldovan cultural life. Many of the country's most famous poets and writers lived in the village, including Vasile Alecsandri and Mihai Eminescu. Razeni was also an important center of agriculture, with many local farmers growing grapes, wheat, and other crops.

During World War II, Razeni was occupied by the Soviet Union. The village suffered significant damage during the war, and many of its residents were killed or forced to flee. After the war, Razeni became part of the Moldavian Soviet Socialist Republic, and its agricultural industry was collectivized.

Following Moldova's independence from the Soviet Union in 1991, Razeni underwent significant changes. Many of its residents began to rebuild their homes and farms, and the village's cultural and historical significance was rediscovered. Today, Razeni is a thriving community that celebrates its rich history and traditions while embracing modernity and progress.

Notable people 
 Ion Inculeț 
 He played a role in improving the infrastructure of Razeni, including roads, bridges, and public buildings. He also supported the establishment of cultural and educational institutions.
 Ion Pelivan
 He was involved in promoting education and culture in Razeni. He helped to establish a library and a theater, and he wrote critically about social and political issues in the town and the wider region.

 Elena Alistar
 She contributed to the cultural development of Razeni through her involvement in the establishment of the Razeni theater. The theater became an important cultural center in the town and the region, and Elena Alistar's contributions to the Moldovan theater scene were also significant.

See also 
 Memorial to the victims of Răzeni Massacre

References

Communes of Ialoveni District